Broderipia rosea is a species of sea snail, a marine gastropod mollusk in the family Trochidae, the top snails.

Description
The height of the shell attains 4⅓ mm, its diameter 2½ mm. The shell is limpet-like, but with a recurved beak projecting beyond the posterior outline of the aperture. The shell is very convex, sloping convexly toward the front margin. The surface of the shell is lusterless, showing under a lens rather rude concentric growth lines, and very numerous, close, fine striae, radiating from the apex to the margins. The coloration consists of narrow red stripes obliquely descending from the median line to the borders, forming a series of V-shaped markings. The beak is rolled forward and a trifle inclined laterally, but the (dextral) apical whorl is lost. The aperture is oval. Its posterior margin is scarcely expanded. Its cavity is deep, scarcely perceptibly and nacreous.

Distribution
This species occurs in the Red Sea, the Indian Ocean and in the Pacific Ocean; off the Cocos Keeling Islands; off Sri Lanka

References

 Broderip, W.J. 1834. Description of a new genus of Gastropoda (Scutella). Proceedings of the Zoological Society of London 1834(2): 47–49 
 Cernohorsky, W.O. 1978. Tropical Pacific marine shells. Sydney : Pacific Publications 352 pp., 68 pls.
 Maes, V.O. 1967. The littoral marine mollusks of Cocos-Keeling Islands (Indian Ocean). Proceedings of the Academy of Natural Sciences, Philadelphia 119: 93–217

rosea
Gastropods described in 1834